Vincent Hunter (born August 5, 1994) is an American professional basketball player for UNICS Kazan of the VTB United League. He played college basketball for UTEP.

High school career
Hunter attended Consortium College Prep, in Detroit, Michigan, where he was named team MVP as a senior, after averaging 26.5 points, 14 rebounds, four blocks and four steals per game, helping the team compile a 20–4 record.

College career
After graduating high school, Hunter joined UTEP, where he played 67 games, starting 58, and averaged 13.6 points, 7.9 rebounds, 2.4 turnovers, 1.4 assists and 1.0 steals per game, over two seasons. Among several college honors, he was named to the watch list of the Julius Erving Award, in his final season with the Miners, an honor that determines the top small forward at the collegiate level. In April 2015, he declared for the NBA draft, following his sophomore season at UTEP.

Professional career

Reno Bighnorns (2015–16)
After failing to be drafted in the 2015 NBA draft, Hunter joined the Philadelphia 76ers, for the 2015 Las Vegas Summer League. He later agreed to terms with Sacramento Kings, signing with the team for training camp on September 9, 2015. However, he was later waived by the Kings, on October 15, after appearing in one preseason game. 

On November 2, he was acquired by the Reno Bighorns, of the NBA Development League, as an affiliate player of the Kings. On November 13, he made his professional debut, in a 123–121 loss to the Los Angeles D-Fenders, recording 21 points, 17 rebounds and one assist, in 40 minutes. On January 29, 2016, he was named to the West All-Star team, for the 2016 NBA D-League All-Star Game. Hunter played his final game for Reno on February 16. In 32 D-League games, he averaged 21.8 points, 11.3 rebounds, 1.4 assists, 1.0 steals and 1.5 blocks per game.

Panathinaikos (2016)
Three days later, he signed with Greek club Panathinaikos, for the rest of the season. In 14 Greek national league games with Panathinaikos, he averaged 2.9 points and 3.3 rebounds per game. He also appeared in eight EuroLeague games, averaging 4.0 points and 1.9 rebounds per game.

Avtodor Saratov (2016–17)
In July 2016, Hunter joined the Los Angeles Clippers, for the Orlando Summer League, and the Memphis Grizzlies for the Las Vegas Summer League. On September 26, 2016, he signed with the Chicago Bulls, but was later waived on October 4. 

Five days later, he signed with the Grizzlies, but he was waived again on October 20, after appearing in four preseason games. On November 26, he signed with the Russian club Avtodor Saratov of the VTB United League.

Memphis Grizzlies (2017–18)
On August 23, 2017, Hunter was selected by the Wisconsin Herd, in the NBA G League expansion draft. However, on September 11 that same year, Hunter signed a two-way contract with the Memphis Grizzlies, meaning that he could split time during the season between the Grizzlies and their own G League affiliate, the Memphis Hustle, instead of the Herd. On January 13, 2018, he was waived by the Grizzlies.

AEK Athens (2018–19)
On January 22, 2018, he moved to Greek club AEK Athens, for the rest of the season. With AEK, he won both FIBA Champions League, and the Greek Cup's 2018 edition. On July 22, 2018, Hunter signed a contract extension with AEK Athens, that would keep with the Greek club for another season.

Virtus Bologna (2019–2021)
On July 22, 2019, he signed with Virtus Bologna of the Italian Lega Basket Serie A (LBA).  On 7 April 2020, after more than a month of suspension, the Italian Basketball Federation officially ended the 2019–20 season, due to the coronavirus pandemic that severely hit Italy. Virtus ended the season first, with 18 wins and only 2 defeats, but the title was not assigned. On 5 May, the EuroCup season ended.

After having knocked out 3–0 both Basket Treviso in the quarterfinals and New Basket Brindisi in the semifinals, on 11 June 2021 Virtus defeated 4–0 its historic rival Olimpia Milano in the national finals, winning its 16th national title and the first one after 20 years. 

Despite having signed a two-year deal with Virtus after the end of the season, on 21 July 2021, the club exited from the contract when Hunter was suspended for three months for having tested positive for the banned drug THC, thereby violating the anti-doping sports code.

Metropolitans 92 (2021–present)
On August 14, 2021, Hunter signed with Metropolitans 92 of the LNB Pro A.

Personal life
Hunter is the son of Rachel Hunter. He has two brothers and one sister. One of his brothers, Matt, played college basketball at Central Connecticut State.

Career statistics

NBA

Regular season

|-
| align="left" | 
| align="left" | Memphis
| 4 || 0 || 1.9 || .600 || – || – || .8 || – || – || .3 || 1.5
|-

Domestic Leagues

Regular season

|-
| 2017–18
| style="text-align:left;"| A.E.K.
| align=center | GBL
| 12 || 15.4 || .635 || .358 || .737 || 2.8 || .3 || .5 || 1.0 || 9.0
|-
| 2018–19
| style="text-align:left;"| A.E.K.
| align=center | GBL
| 26 || 25.0 || .561 || .125 || .634 || 5.7 || 1.4 || 1.5 || .7 || 13.3
|}

FIBA Champions League

|-
| style="text-align:left;background:#AFE6BA;" | 2017–18†
| style="text-align:left;" | A.E.K.
| 8 || 16.3 || .636 || – || .577 || 4.4 || .1 || .9 || 1.5 || 8.9
|-
| style="text-align:left;" | 2018–19
| style="text-align:left;" | A.E.K.
| 18 || 26.3 || .663 || – || .618 || 8.1 || 1.7 || 1.3 || 1.1 || 18.0
|}

Awards and accomplishments

Pro career
 FIBA Intercontinental Cup champion: 2019
 Basketball Champions League champion: 2018
 Greek Basketball Cup winner: 2018

Individual
 Basketball Champions League Star Lineup: 2018–19
 Basketball Champions League Top Scorer: 2018–19
 Greek Basket League Top Scorer: 2018–19
 3 x Basketball Champions League Game Day MVP (2017–18: Gameday 4, Gameday 12, Gameday 13)
 2018–19 Basketball Champions League Highest Efficiency per game: 22.8
 2018–19 Basketball Champions League Most points per game: 18.0
 2018–19 Greek Basket League Most points (full season): 508
 2018–19 Greek Basket League Most points (playoffs): 162
 2018–19 Greek Basket League PIR leader (full season): 571
 2018–19 Greek Basket League Steals leader (full season): 52
 2018–19 Greek Basket League Steals leader (regular season): 40
 2018–19 Greek Basket League Two-point scoring leader (full season): 203
 2018–19 Greek Basket League Two-point scoring leader (regular season): 142
 2018–19 Greek Basket League Two-point scoring leader (playoffs): 61
 NBA G League All-Star: 2016
 First-team All-Conference USA (2015)
 Second-team All-Conference USA (2014)
 Conference USA Freshman of the Year (2014)
 Conference USA All-Freshman Team (2014)

References

External links
 Vince Hunter at baskethotel.com
 Vince Hunter at euroleague.net
 Vince Hunter at nbadleague.com
 Vince Hunter at paobc.gr
 UTEP Miners bio

1994 births
Living people
AEK B.C. players
American expatriate basketball people in Greece
American expatriate basketball people in Italy
American expatriate basketball people in Russia
American men's basketball players
Basketball players from Detroit
BC Avtodor Saratov players
BC UNICS players
Centers (basketball)
Lega Basket Serie A players
Memphis Grizzlies players
Memphis Hustle players
Metropolitans 92 players
Panathinaikos B.C. players
Power forwards (basketball)
Reno Bighorns players
Undrafted National Basketball Association players
UTEP Miners men's basketball players
Virtus Bologna players